A hat is an item of clothing worn on the head.

Hat may also refer to:

People
 Jack McVitie (1932–1967), known as Jack "The Hat", English gangster
 Les Miles (born 1953), known as The Hat, American football coach
 Jan Åge Solstad (born 1969), known as Hat, former vocalist for the Norwegian black metal band Gorgoroth

Places
 Hať, Moravian-Silesian Region, Czech Republic
 Hat, Azerbaijan
 Hat, Nepal
 Hat District, Al Mahrah Governorate, Yemen
 Hat Island (disambiguation)

Organisations
 Handball Association of Thailand, governing body of handball in Thailand
 Hutchison Asia Telecom Group, a business division in telecommunications
 Hellenic Aeronautical Technologies, a Greek aeroplane manufacturer
 Helicopter Air Transport, a defunct American helicopter operator

Science
 HAt, symbol for hydrogen astatide
 Histone acetyltransferase, an enzyme class
 HAT medium, used in microbiology and immunology, for example in culturing hybridoma cells
 Hungarian-made Automated Telescope, used in the HATNet Project

Mathematics
 Hat matrix, a mathematical operation in statistics
 Hat operator, notation used in mathematics
 Hat function, alternate name for the triangular function

Technology
 Hardware Attached on Top, expansion board format for the Raspberry Pi computer. 
 Hashed array tree, in computer programming.
 Help authoring tool, software for "help" documents.

Film
The Hat (film), a 1999 short film by Michèle Cournoyer
The Hat, a 1912 film by Rollin S. Sturgeon
The Hat, a 1963 film by Faith Hubley and John Hubley

Other uses
 , an Afrikaans dictionary
 Haitian Creole language, with ISO 639-2 and 639-3 code hat
 Hat, slang for the caret (computing) (^)
 Hat, slang for the circumflex (ˆ)
 Hat (Davy Graham album), released in 1969
 Hat. (Mike Keneally album), released in 1992
 History Aptitude Test, an admissions test at Oxford University
 The Hat, a Southern California fast-food restaurant
 The Hat (book), a children's book by Tomi Ungerer
 "The Hat", an episode of Homicide: Life on the Street (season 4)
 Hi-hat (instrument), a standard part of a drum kit

See also
 Hats (disambiguation)
 Hatt (disambiguation)
 Het (disambiguation)
 Hett (disambiguation)
 Mr. Hat